The Kayseri Atatürk Stadium disaster refers to an occurrence of football hooliganism, resulting in 43 deaths and at least 300 injuries (according to newspaper Hürriyets headline 600), during the football match held on September 17, 1967 between the clubs of Kayserispor and Sivasspor at the Atatürk Stadium of Kayseri in Turkey. It was known as the worst sports-related violence to occur in Turkey.

The violence started following provocation by the Kayserispor fans at half-time, after Kayserispor took the lead in the first half. Supporters of the two teams, some of them armed with bats and knives, began to throw rocks at each other, and fans fleeing the violence caused a stampede in front of the stand exits. The events in the stadium were then followed by vandalism in Kayseri and days of riots in Sivas.

References 

Sport in Kayseri
Kayseri Erciyesspor
Sivasspor
1967 in Turkey
Man-made disasters in Turkey
Stadium disasters
Association football riots
1967 riots
Association football hooliganism
Riots and civil disorder in Turkey
History of Kayseri
History of Sivas
History of football in Turkey
UEFA
1967 crimes in Turkey
1967 disasters in Turkey